Millice Culpin (1 December 1846 – 1 September 1941) was an Australian politician. Born in Hertfordshire, England, he was educated at Alleynes Grammar School and then the University of Edinburgh, after which he became a doctor. He migrated to Australia in 1891. In 1903, he was elected to the Australian House of Representatives as the Labor member for Brisbane after the appearance of a second Protectionist candidate William Morse allowed him to defeat sitting member Thomas Macdonald-Paterson. Culpin was defeated in 1906 and became a suburban doctor in Brisbane. He died there in 1941 and was buried in Toowong Cemetery.

References

1846 births
1941 deaths
Australian Labor Party members of the Parliament of Australia
Members of the Australian House of Representatives for Brisbane
Members of the Australian House of Representatives
English emigrants to colonial Australia
Burials at Toowong Cemetery
20th-century Australian politicians